Phyllis Platt (1 July 1886 – 11 February 1950) was a British painter. Her work was part of the painting event in the art competition at the 1948 Summer Olympics.

References

1886 births
1950 deaths
20th-century British painters
British women painters
Olympic competitors in art competitions
People from Gorleston-on-Sea